Zagorsk Pumped Storage Station (Russian: Заго́рская гидроаккумули́рующая электроста́нция) is a pumped-storage hydroelectric power station near Sergiev Posad, Russia. Zagorsk-1 has a  installed capacity and was Russia's first power plant of that type. The project was approved in 1974, the first two generators operational in 1987 and the rest by 2000. Zagorsk-2 with a future installed capacity of 840 MW is currently being constructed adjacent to it.

See also 

 List of power stations in Russia

References

Energy infrastructure completed in 1987
Energy infrastructure completed in 2000
Hydroelectric power stations in Russia
Pumped-storage hydroelectric power stations
Hydroelectric power stations built in the Soviet Union